Le Mont is a commune in the Vosges department in Grand Est in northeastern France.

Geography
Le Mont is a semi-mountainous commune on the eastern edge of Grand Est, half way between Senones and the Hantz Pass. The little River Boucard, a tributary of the Rabodeau, flows through the village. The name of the commune refers to an isolated sandstone hillock which lies within the commune, and which is 730 metres above sea level at its summit.

History
Like its neighbouring communes, Le Mont was part of the Principality of Salm-Salm until 1793.

See also
Communes of the Vosges department

References

Communes of Vosges (department)
Salm-Salm